Pool B of the 2007 Rugby World Cup began on 8 September and was completed on 29 September. The pool was composed of 2003 hosts Australia, as well as Canada, Fiji, Japan and Wales.

Wales' 38–34 loss to Fiji in their final pool game (their third World Cup loss to a Pacific island nation, having previously been beaten 16–13 by Western Samoa in 1991 and 38-31 by Samoa in 1999, both times in Cardiff), meant Fiji qualified for the quarter-finals at Wales' expense. Australia finished in top spot with the maximum of 20 points, while Japan and Canada played out the first draw in a Rugby World Cup game since a 20–20 draw between France and Scotland back in 1987. Neither Japan nor Canada managed to win any of their four games, with a single bonus point in Japan's favour proving the difference between them, after they managed to remain within 7 points of Fiji in a 35–31 defeat.

Standings

All times local (UTC+2)

Matches

Australia vs Japan

 Australia's starting 15 in this match was the most-experienced starting team in the sport's history, as measured by total number of international caps entering the match. The Wallabies squad that took the field for the opening kickoff had earned a combined total of 798 caps.

Wales vs Canada

Japan vs Fiji

Wales vs Australia

Fiji vs Canada

Wales vs Japan

Australia vs Fiji

Canada vs Japan

Australia vs Canada

Wales vs Fiji

References

External links

Pool B at rugbyworldcup.com

Pool B
2007–08 in Welsh rugby union
2007–08 in Japanese rugby union
2007 in Australian rugby union
2007 in Canadian rugby union
2007 in Fijian rugby union